The Edmonton trolley bus system formed part of the public transport network in Edmonton, Alberta, Canada between 1939 and 2009.

History

Trolley bus service in Edmonton started on September 24, 1939, operating on route 5 from 101 St/Jasper Ave to 95 St/111 Ave. By the end of October of that year, service had started on another route running to 99 St/Whyte Ave via the Low Level Bridge. In Edmonton, trolley buses were often referred to simply as "trolleys".

The trolley bus system used a mixture of Ohio Brass and K&M Elastic (Swiss) suspension for holding up the overhead wires.

The 49 vehicles remaining in use in 2008 were from an order of 100 manufactured in 1981–82 by Brown Boveri & Company (BBC), using bodies and chassis supplied to BBC by GM. These 100 vehicles for Edmonton were the only trolley buses ever built with the GM "New Look" body, whereas more than 44,000 motor buses were built to that design.

In 2007, a low-floor model of trolley bus was leased from Coast Mountain Bus Company, Vancouver's bus operating company, for a one-year period, for testing of possible benefits of low-floor trolley buses over hybrid diesel buses. During its time in Edmonton the bus was numbered 6000, but its Vancouver number, 2242, was restored when it returned to there.

On June 18, 2008, city council voted 7 to 6 in favour of phasing out the trolley bus system in 2009 and 2010. However, city council decided in April 2009 that trolley bus service would be discontinued earlier than originally planned, in order to reduce the city's expected $35 million deficit in 2009. The last day of service was May 2, 2009.

Fleet

Depots
Cromdale Garage - formerly Edmonton Radial Railway trolley bus / streetcar barn, then bus facility and historic fleet storage. Has since been demolished, site being repurposed by ETS.
Ferrier Garage - formerly trolley bus barn; now a bus facility.
Mitchell Garage - formerly trolley bus barn; now a bus facility.
 Westwood Garage - formerly trolley bus barn; now a bus facility.
Strathcona Garage - formerly bus / trolley bus garage (1951–1986); now home to Old Strathcona Farmer's Market and Edmonton Radial Railway Society High Level Bridge Streetcar storage.

Preservation

At least five of Edmonton's 1982 BBC HR150G trolley buses have been preserved by museums or museum-type groups.  Those at museums are No. 125, at the Seashore Trolley Museum (in Kennebunkport, Maine, United States); No. 181, at the Illinois Railway Museum (in Union, Illinois, U.S.); and No. 189, at the Trolleybus Museum at Sandtoft (U.K.).  No. 132 has been preserved by the Transit Museum Society in Vancouver.  In addition, a BBC is expected to be added to the City of Edmonton's collection of historic vehicles, which already includes three vintage trolley buses: Pullman 113 (ex-116) and CCF-Brills 148 and 202. No. 199 has been preserved by the Reynolds Alberta Museum in Wetaskiwin, Alberta. No. 152 was expected to be preserved for the future public transit museum in Sofia, Bulgaria. A group of enthusiasts managed to raise the $10,000 needed for its purchase, but the trolleybus had already been scrapped in early 2018.

See also

History of Edmonton
List of trolley bus systems in Canada
St. Albert Transit
Strathcona County Transit

References

External links

 
 

Bus transport in Alberta
Edmonton Transit Service
History of Edmonton
Edmonton
Edmonton
1939 establishments in Alberta
2009 disestablishments in Alberta